The Journal of Cardiovascular Nursing is a bimonthly peer-reviewed nursing journal covering cardiac nursing. It is published by Lippincott Williams & Wilkins and was established in 1986, with Barbara Riege as its founding editor-in-chief. It is the official journal of the Preventive Cardiovascular Nurses Association and its current editor-in-chief is Debra K. Moser (University of Kentucky).

Abstracting and indexing 
The journal is abstracted and indexed in:
CINAHL
EBSCO databases
Embase
MEDLINE/PubMed
ProQuest databases
PsycINFO
Science Citation Index Expanded
Scopus
Social Sciences Citation Index

According to the Journal Citation Reports, the journal has a 2017 impact factor of 2.097.

See also

List of nursing journals

References

External links

Cardiac nursing journals
Bimonthly journals
Lippincott Williams & Wilkins academic journals
English-language journals
Publications established in 1986